"Key of Heart" is BoA's 20th Japanese single and 6th Korean single. The single was available solely in CD+DVD format in Japan with a "special summer low price" and first pressing to commemorate this for being her 20th single.

Compared to previous singles, the sales for "Key of Heart" were low, but this was due to BoA being preoccupied with other projects and the lack of promotion from Avex Trax.

Music video
BoA's Key of Heart music video features BoA singing in a suburb land while driving a jeep. Then dancing on a mountain with 4 other dancers then she meets up with the dancers in a little town, they then dance on the streets. This music video also features BoA singing next to a river. Music video was shot in Lone Pine, California.

Commercial endorsements
Key of Heart was used as the theme song for the Japanese version of the movie Over the Hedge and also served as a background song in the music.jp commercials. Dotch was used as the background song for the Kosé Fasio commercials. 

In the Korean version of Key Of Heart the music video, it features Donghae from Super Junior. The music videos Key Of Heart show a sad love story. BoA was in a relationship with Donghae who gives her a necklace with a heart pendant (a couple pendant). On her first performance, Donghae decides to give her flowers before she goes on stage and ends up in an accident due to which he dies. A scientist decides to make him a cyborg and succeeds in making a cyborg Donghae. Donghae notices that BoA is wearing the pendant he had given her before he died and realizes that she was the one he loved. He then appears in all of her performances/public appearances and takes photos of her. During one of these outings he sees her current boyfriend and is heartbroken but continues taking photos of her. On another occasion, he goes to take photos of her during her rehearsal and a stage light nearly falls on her. He quickly leaps in and saves her. She picks up his camera and sees her photos on it. The video ends with them crossing paths and her noticing the heart pendant attached to his camera as a charm. She sees the photos of their past and starts crying as the security guards don't let her go to Donghae.

Track listing

 Regular edition CD single — Japanese
 Key of Heart
 Dotch

 DVD 
 Key of Heart (video clip)

 First press edition CD single — Japanese
 Key of Heart
 Dotch
 Key of Heart (English ver.)

 DVD
 Key of Heart (video clip)
 Key of Heart (road movie)

 Digital single — Korean
 Key of Heart

 CD single — Korean
 Key of Heart
 Dotch
 Key of Heart (English ver.)
 Key of Heart (Korean ver.)

 DVD
 Key of Heart (M/V)
 Key of Heart (road movie)

TV performances
January 26, 2007 — Music Station - Key of Heart

Charts and certifications

Daily and weekly charts

Monthly charts

Certifications

Release history

References
http://www.avexnet.or.jp/boa/

2006 singles
BoA songs
Pop ballads
Torch songs
Dance-pop songs
Song articles with missing songwriters